Lieutenant-General Jocelyn Paul,  (born January 3, 1964) is a senior Canadian Forces officer that currently serves as commander of the Canadian Army and chief of the Army Staff since June 16, 2022.

Early life and education
Paul was born and raised in Wendake, a First Nations community in Quebec. He is a member of the Huron-Wendat.

Paul attended the Université du Québec à Chicoutimi, where he studied history and earned a bachelor's degree in 1988. He then went on to complete a master's degree in anthropology at the Université de Montréal in 1991.

Military career
Paul joined the reserve force in 1988 as an infantry officer with the Régiment du Saguenay and Régiment de Maisonneuve. He transferred to the regular force in 1991 as part of the Royal 22e Régiment. He was promoted to lieutenant-general in 2021, when he was appointed Deputy Commander Allied Joint Forces Command Naples.

On April 21, 2022, the Department of National Defence announced that Paul had been selected to become the next commander of the Canadian Army. He took over the role on June 16, 2022. He will be the first Indigenous person to serve in this position.

References

1964 births
Canadian generals
Canadian military personnel from Quebec
Commanders of the Canadian Army
Commanders of the Order of Military Merit (Canada)
Living people
Officers of the Legion of Merit
Recipients of the Meritorious Service Decoration